Best Performance by an Actor (Non-Feature) is a defunct Canadian award, which was presented by the Canadian Film Awards from 1969 to 1978, by the Genie Awards in 1980 and by the shortlived Bijou Awards in 1981, to honour the best performance by an actor in film which was not a theatrical feature film, such as television films or short films.

1960s

1970s

1980s

References

Genie Awards